The University of Pennsylvania School of Social Policy and Practice, commonly known as Penn SP2, is a school of social policy and social work in the United States whose vision is "The passionate pursuit of social innovation, impact and justice." Originally named the School of Social Work, the school was founded in 1908 and is a graduate school of the University of Pennsylvania. The school specializes in research, education, and policy development in relation to both social and economic issues. Penn SP2 is currently ranked as one of the leading schools for social policy and social work graduate education. The school offers degrees in a variety of subfields of social policy and social work, in addition to several dual degree programs and sub-matriculation programs.

Programs
They offer five degree programs: Master of Social Work (MSW), Master of Science in Nonprofit Leadership (MSNPL), Master of Science in Social Policy (MSSP), Clinical Doctorate in Social Work (DSW), and PhD in Social Welfare and eleven dual degree programs.

Notable faculty and staff and alumni
 Ashley Biden
 Peter Frumkin
 Richard James Gelles
 Robert Woodson, awarded (a) MSW degree,(b) 1990 MacArthur Fellows Program “genius” award, (c) 2008 Bradley Foundation Prize, and (d) 2008 Social Entrepreneurship Award from the Manhattan Institute.

Research centers
 Center for High Impact Philanthropy
 Center for Mental Health & Aging (CMHA)
 Center for Social Impact Strategy (CSIS)
 The Evelyn Jacobs Ortner Center on Family Violence
 Field Center for Children's Policy, Practice & Research
 National Center on Homelessness among Veterans (NCHAV)

References

External links
 Official Website

Educational institutions established in 1948
University of Pennsylvania schools
Schools of social work in the United States
1948 establishments in Pennsylvania